Bow Valley College is a public, board-governed college operating as a comprehensive community institution under the Post-Secondary Learning Act of Alberta. The branch campuses are: Airdrie, Banff, Cochrane, Okotoks, and Strathmore. Bow Valley College is a member of the Alberta Rural Development Network and Colleges and Institutes Canada.

Calgary and region’s only Comprehensive Community College — with 14,000 full- and part-time students, Bow Valley College helps Open Doors – Open Minds to in-demand jobs in Calgary, Alberta, and Canada. Bow Valley College graduates contribute to the digital economy, careers in business, TV & film production, and serve on the frontlines of healthcare and social services. Bow Valley College invests in three applied research pillars: educational technology, social innovation, and health.

Programs
The college offers academic programs in a variety of areas including career training, university transfer courses, adult upgrading, and English language learning. The college is divided into specialized schools:
 Centre for Entertainment Arts
 Chiu School of Business offers training in business and health administration.
 Continuing Learning administers the college's professional development ("continuing education") programming and open studies courses.
 Regional Stewardship offers programming at campuses located in Airdrie, Cochrane, and Okotoks where learners may access services such as classrooms, advising, and invigilation.
 School of Community Studies provides programs in social services, education and early learning, justice, and community services.
 School of Foundational Learning provides adult high school upgrading, basic literacy programs, and workplace training.
 School of Global Access is the college's hub for English language learning, services and programs for newcomers to Canada, and inter-cultural learning.
 School of Health and Wellness offers studies towards careers as a healthcare aide, nurse, pharmacy technician, and more.
 School of Technology offers education in information technology and design.

History
It was founded as the Alberta Vocational Centre in 1965. Since 1972, it has been located on 3rd Street and 6th Avenue Southeast in Calgary and continues to expand its footprint between downtown Calgary and the city's East Village.

In 1998, the college transitioned from a government-administered model to an autonomous, board-governed public college and adopted the name Bow Valley College to reflect the region (the Bow Valley) which the college serves.

Facilities
In May 2013, the college unveiled its new South Campus building on 6th Avenue Southeast. The South Campus building hosts the Calgary operations of Athabasca University, Olds College Fashion Institute, and the University of Lethbridge.

Beyond downtown Calgary, the college operates smaller campuses in the communities of Airdrie, Banff, Cochrane, Okotoks, and Strathmore, and offers academic and career education on a number of the region's Indigenous nations.

Scholarships
There are more than 300 awards and bursaries available for students through Bow Valley College. Bow Valley College is committed to ensuring that all students are able to access the life-changing possibilities of an education free from financial stress and pressures. Many generous donors make an impact on the lives of students and help them reach their goals.

See also
 Education in Alberta
 List of universities and colleges in Alberta
 Higher education in Alberta
 Canadian government scientific research organizations
 Canadian university scientific research organizations
 Canadian industrial research and development organizations

References

External links
 Bow Valley College Website
 Bow Valley College Scholarships and Bursaries page

Universities and colleges in Calgary
Colleges in Alberta
Educational institutions established in 1965
Vocational education in Canada
1965 establishments in Alberta